Hans Tobeason is a television screenwriter and executive producer.  He created the Freedom science fiction series  and was writer and co-executive producer for Birds of Prey.

For his first professional television work,  Tobeason was nominated with David J. Burke for the 1993 Writers Guild of America Award for the pilot episode, "The Box," for the TriBeCa anthology series drama.

He graduated from Harvard College in 1981.

References

External links
 

Living people
Year of birth missing (living people)
American television writers
American male television writers
American television producers
Harvard College alumni